This is a list of members of the Riksdag, the national parliament of Sweden. The Riksdag is a unicameral assembly with 349 members of parliament, who at the time were elected on a proportional basis to serve fixed terms of three years. In the Riksdag, members are seated per constituency and not party. The following MPs were elected in the 1991 Swedish general election and served until the 1994 Swedish general election. Members of the social democratic Cabinet of Göran Persson, the ruling party during this term, are marked in bold, party leaders of the seven parties represented in the Riksdag in italic.

Elected parliamentarians

Notes

1991 in Sweden
1992 in Sweden
1993 in Sweden
1994 in Sweden
1991-1994
List